Michael Vey: Battle of the Ampere is the third book of the seven book Michael Vey series, written by Richard Paul Evans.   It was published September 17, 2013 by Simon Pulse/Mercury Ink. The first book in the series, Michael Vey: The Prisoner of Cell 25, was #1 on the New York Times Best Seller list.

Plot Summary
Following where the previous book left off, Michael is held by a tribe of natives. During this time, he meets a new Glow: Tessa, known before as Tesla, who escaped from Hatch. She is able to increase the powers of the other electric children. Michael is soon told he and Tessa are going to meet Jaime, the man who helped the Electroclan in the previous book. As they depart, Tessa has a tearful goodbye with one of the tribal women whom she calls her mother. Jaime takes them to his base camp where they are ambushed by Elgen guards. As Michael, Tessa, and Jamie are attacked, the native amacarra  tribe that helped Michael and Tessa is wiped out by the Peruvian army, who have sided with the Elgen. Michael is forced to kill the guards with the camp's security system to evade capture. Jaime, Tessa, and Michael destroy the camp and hike away to prevent the Elgen from learning anything.

Meanwhile, Taylor and the rest of the Electroclan have been captured by the Peruvian authorities for destroying the Elgen's power plant. While being interrogated, Taylor inadvertently tells the Elgen about the Voice that has been helping them. Ostin leads an escape attempt, but the group is captured by Elgen agents and then re-captured by the Peruvians.

After extensive hiking, Michael, Tessa, and Jaime set a trap to disrupt the convoy carrying the rest of the Electroclan. Michael manages to stop the convoy and frees everyone but Taylor and Jack who were taken by an Elgen bounty hunter. The Electroclan rescues them, but Wade is killed by a stray Elgen Guard. After an improvised memorial service, the Electroclan go to a hotel to meet Jaime.

Jaime takes them to a safe house where they are told that Hatch plans to use the Elgen fleet to take over a small island country and from there build an arsenal of EMPs to take over the world. The Electroclan is to destroy the fleet's flagship: the Ampere. However, Ian, Zeus, Abigail, and Tessa, who are tired of running, decide to leave. Michael, Taylor, Ostin, McKenna, and Jack attack the Ampere but are cornered in the ship's engine room. As they prepare to detonate the bomb manually, the Elgen's battleship Watt explodes and Tessa, Zeus, Abigail, and Ian return. The Ampere is then blown up while everyone escapes.

During a celebration for the mission's success, Taylor and Michael award Wade the Electroclan Medal of Valor to commemorate his sacrifice and to ease a grieving Jack. Jaime allows Michael and Ostin to talk to their parents. The joy is cut short when it is revealed that Hatch escaped the ship before it blew and has kidnapped a child prodigy in China, known as Jade Dragon, who has figured out how to fix the MEI machine and create more electric children.

Following Terms and Jargon

MEI (Magnetic Electron Induction): A machine created originally for bodily imaging but malfunctioned with the "Glows" as a result of the accident.

Electroclan: A part of the resistance that opposes Hatch's plans to take over the world.

Glow(s): People born with some sort of electrical ability.

EMP: ElectroMagnetic Pulse, capable of destroying all electrical components and can be very dangerous if released on any country's infrastructure.

Sequel
The sequel of this book, Michael Vey: Hunt for Jade Dragon was published on September 16, 2014.

Main characters
 Michael Vey: A Glow. The main protagonist  of the series.  Has Tourette's syndrome, and electrical shocking powers (known as "surging" or "pulsing"). Leader of the Electroclan.
 Taylor: A Glow. Michael's girlfriend and a member of the Electroclan. She can manipulate electrical activity in people's brains and essentially reboot them.
 Ostin: A Non-Electric. Michael's best friend and a member of the Electroclan. Highly intelligent.
 Ian: A Glow. Member of the Electroclan. He can see through walls by electrolocation.
 Abigail: Member of the Electroclan. Stimulate nerve endings to take away pain, but still feels some of it. But she can not take away her own pain
 McKenna: A Glow. Member of the Electroclan. Creates heat and light.
 Jack:  A Non-Electric. Member of the Electroclan. Martial arts. Drives.
 Wade:  A Non-Electric. Member of the Electroclan. Martial arts. Drives. Died from being shot (RIP).
 Zeus: A Glow. Member of the Electroclan. Discharges lightning.
 Tessa: A Glow. Member of the Electroclan. Enhance electric powers of other electric children.
 Tanner: A Glow. Creates mechanical problems, usually brings down planes.
 Grace: A Glow. Human flash drive
 Tara: A Glow. Is loyal to Hatch. Can affect emotions. Is Taylor's evil twin.
 Quentin: A Glow. Is loyal to Hatch. Can create an electromagnetic pulse.
 Torstyn: A Glow. Is loyal to Hatch. Produces microwaves. Sadistic and nasty.
 Bryan: A Glow. Is loyal to Hatch. Can cut through items with a concentrated beam.
 Kylee: A Glow. Is loyal to Hatch. Magnetic powers which allows her to walk on metal walls.
 Jaime:  A Non-Electric. A jungle guide who works for the voice.
 The Voice:  A Non-Electric. A mysterious ally of the Electroclan.

Reception
The book debuted as USA Today's #10 best-selling book in September 2013.

References

External links
 Michael Vey Official Site
 Richard Paul Evans Official Website

2013 American novels
2013 science fiction novels
American science fiction novels
American young adult novels
Battle of the Ampere, Michael Vay
Sequel novels
Superhero novels
Simon & Schuster books